Christoffer Lisson (born 28 November 1995) is a Danish cyclist, who currently rides for UCI Continental team .

Major results

2013
 1st  Overall GP Général Patton
 2nd Overall Tour du Pays de Vaud
 3rd Overall Aubel–Thimister–La Gleize
2017
 2nd Chrono des Nations U23
 6th Memorial Philippe Van Coningsloo
 9th Kalmar Grand Prix
2018
 3rd Skive–Løbet
 National Road Championships
8th Road race
9th Time trial
 8th Overall Paris–Arras Tour
 8th Ringerike GP
2019
 3rd Skive–Løbet
 National Road Championships
5th Road race
8th Time trial
 5th Duo Normand
 5th Chrono Champenois
 9th Overall Tour of Denmark
 9th Kalmar Grand Prix

References

External links

1995 births
Living people
Danish male cyclists
People from Kalundborg
Sportspeople from Region Zealand